Stick It is a 1972 studio album by Buddy Rich, with his big band. The album was his third for RCA Records as well as his last album for the label prior to his 1976 album Speak No Evil.

Track listing 
LP side A
"Space Shuttle" (John LaBarbera) – 4:19
"God Bless the Child" (Arthur Herzog Jr., Billie Holiday) – 4:48
"Best Coast" (John LaBarbera) – 3:58
"Wave" (Antonio Carlos Jobim) – 4:15
LP side B
"Something" (George Harrison) – 3:25
"Uncle Albert/Admiral Halsey" (Paul McCartney, Linda McCartney) – 7:57
"Sassy Strut" (John LaBarbera) – 6:06
"Bein' Green" (Joe Raposo) – 2:58
bonus track on 1999 RCA CD re-issue
"Space Shuttle" – 10:38 (extended version)

track order on CD re-issue differs from original LP

Personnel 
The Buddy Rich big band
 Buddy Rich – drums
 Joel DiBartolo – double bass
 Pat LaBarbera – flute, soprano saxophone, tenor saxophone
 Joe Romano – flute, alto saxophone
 Brian A. Grivna – flute, alto saxophone
 Don Englert – flute, tenor saxophone
 Walter Namuth – guitar
 George McFetridge – piano
 Richard Centalonza – baritone saxophone
 Eric Culver – trombone
 Alan Kaplan – trombone
 William Reichenbach – bass trombone
 Greg Hopkins – trumpet, arranger
 Lin Biviano, John DeFlon, Wayne Naus – trumpet

Production
 Pete Spargo – producer
 James Nichols – reissue producer
 Janet DeMatteis – art direction
 Jim Crotty – engineer
 Griffin Norman – design
 Chuck Stewart – photography

References

RCA LSP 4802 (LP)
RCA 68732 (1999 CD)
BMG 37434 (2005 CD)

1972 albums
Buddy Rich albums
RCA Records albums